Chaitrada Premanjali is a 1992 Indian Kannada-language romance drama film directed and written by S. Narayan making his debut in direction. The film stars newcomers Raghuveer and Shwetha along with Lokesh and Abhijeeth in other pivotal roles. The film met with positive reviews upon release from critics and audience eventually becoming the musical hit of the year.

The film featured original score and soundtrack composed and written by Hamsalekha. The soundtrack proved to be one of the biggest hit albums of the year.

Plot
Fresh faces romance with a tragic end. Karate champion Prem (Raghuveer) goes to the family country retreat to practice for a tournament and falls for village girl Anju (Shweta). Her father (Lokesh), however, prevents the marriage and tries to force her to marry a womanizer with an obliging father. Prem wins his trophy and rescues Anju, but the couple is killed by the bad guys.

Cast 

 Raghuveer as Prem
 Shwetha as Anju
 Abhijeeth as Mahesh, an evil man 
 Lokesh as Seenappa, Anju's father 
 Srinivasa Murthy as Manmatha Rao, Prem's father 
 Rajanand as Manjayya, servant of Prem's estate 
 Jyothi Gurucharan as step-mother 
 Ashalatha as Prem's dead mother 
 Sathyajith as karate trainer 
 S. Narayan as Shankar, Prem's close friend
 Swasthik Shankar as Jagapathi Rao, Mahesh's father
 Shobharaj as Veerabhadra 
 Thriller manju as Robert, karate champion 
 Vikram 
 K.D. Venkatesh 
 Guru Murthy

Soundtrack 
The music was composed and written by Hamsalekha for Lahari Music audio company.

References

External links 
 

1992 films
1990s Kannada-language films
Indian romantic drama films
1992 romantic drama films
Films scored by Hamsalekha
Films directed by S. Narayan
1992 directorial debut films